Oscar Pisano (born 3 September 1956) is a retired Argentine football defender who went on to become a football manager. Pisano spent time in numerous North American indoor and outdoor leagues including the North American Soccer League, Major Indoor Soccer League, American Soccer League, American Professional Soccer League and Canadian National Soccer League. He earned two caps with the Argentina national futsal team in 1994 and 1995.

Player
Pisano spent most of his playing career in the United States where he played indoor and outdoor soccer. In 1979, he signed with the Memphis Rogues of the North American Soccer League. He played only one game before being released. He was then signed with the Cleveland Cobras of the American Soccer League. In the fall of 1979, he signed with the Cleveland Force of the Major Indoor Soccer League. He returned to the Cobras for the 1980 outdoor season before joining the Buffalo Stallions of MISL in the fall of 1980. During his years with the Stallions, he continued outdoors during the summer with the Rochester Flash of the American Soccer League in 1981, 1982 and 1983. In 1984, he played for the Buffalo Storm in the United Soccer League. He then moved to the Canton Invaders of the American Indoor Soccer Association. He would go on to play ten seasons with the Invaders. In 1986, he played for Toronto Italia in the Canadian National Soccer League. In 1990, he played for the Orlando Lions of the American Professional Soccer League. In summers of 1994 and 1995, he played for the Las Vegas Dustdevils in the Continental Indoor Soccer League. He played for the Argentina national indoor football team twice between 1994 and 1995. In 1995, he played for the Buffalo Blizzard of the National Professional Soccer League.

Coach
In September 1992, he was elevated to head coach of the Invaders. In 1996, Oscar was hired as Assistant Coach of the Columbus Crew. Coaching there until 21 January 1998, when he was named an assistant coach with the Dallas Burn of Major League Soccer.

Yearly Awards
1984–1985 AISA – Defender of the Year
1984–1985 AISA – All-Star Team
1984–1986 AISA – Defender of the Year
1984–1986 AISA – All-Star Team

References

External links
Profile at NASL Jerseys
1990 A-League squads

Living people
1956 births
Footballers from Buenos Aires
American Indoor Soccer Association players
American Professional Soccer League players
American Soccer League (1933–1983) players
Argentine expatriate sportspeople in Canada
Argentine expatriate sportspeople in the United States
Argentine expatriate footballers
Argentine footballers
Buffalo Blizzard players
Buffalo Stallions players
Buffalo Storm players
Canton Invaders players
Cleveland Cobras players
Cleveland Force (original MISL) players
Continental Indoor Soccer League players
Expatriate soccer players in Canada
Expatriate soccer players in the United States
Las Vegas Dustdevils players
Major Indoor Soccer League (1978–1992) players
Memphis Rogues players
National Professional Soccer League (1984–2001) players
North American Soccer League (1968–1984) players
Orlando Lions players
Rochester Flash players
Toronto Italia players
United Soccer League (1984–85) players
Canadian National Soccer League players
Association football defenders